The IBSF World Championships 2016 took place at the Olympic Sliding Centre Innsbruck in Igls, Austria, from 8 to 21 February 2016.

Schedule
Six events were held.

All times are local (UTC+1).

Medal summary

Medal table

Bobsleigh

Skeleton

Mixed

References

External links
Official website

 
2016
International sports competitions hosted by Austria
2016 in bobsleigh
2016 in skeleton
2016 in Austrian sport
Bobsleigh in Austria
Skeleton in Austria
February 2016 sports events in Europe